Caroline? is a 1990 American made-for-television drama film based on E. L. Konigsburg's novel Father's Arcane Daughter starring Stephanie Zimbalist, Pamela Reed and George Grizzard. The film is directed by Joseph Sargent and aired on CBS on April 29, 1990, part of the Hallmark Hall of Fame anthology series. The film won three Primetime Emmy Awards.

Plot
A woman presumed dead for 15 years returns to her family shortly before a large inheritance is due. While she certainly seems to be the missing woman, there are doubts about her identity among those who knew her. The truth, her motivations for what she has done, and the results she accomplished are heart-warming.

Cast
 Stephanie Zimbalist as Caroline
 Pamela Reed as Grace Carmichael
 George Grizzard as Paul Carmichael
 Patricia Neal as Miss Trollope
 Dorothy McGuire as Flora Atkins
 Shawn Phelan as Winston Carmichael
 Jenny Jacobs as Heidi Carmichael
 John Evans as Winston as Adult
 John Bennes as Simmons

Primetime Emmy Awards
 Outstanding Made for Television Movie (won)
 Outstanding Directing for a Miniseries or Special (Joseph Sargent) (won)
 Outstanding Editing for a Miniseries or Special — Single Camera Production (Paul LaMastra) (won)

External links

1990 television films
1990 films
1990 drama films
Hallmark Hall of Fame episodes
American drama television films
Films based on American novels
Films about children
Films about families
Films about siblings
Films set in the 1950s
Films directed by Joseph Sargent
Primetime Emmy Award for Outstanding Made for Television Movie winners
1990s English-language films
1990s American films